Lieutenant-General Sir Richard Harte Keatinge Butler  (28 August 1870 – 22 April 1935) was a British Army general during the First World War. He was Chief of Staff to First Army for much of 1915, then Deputy Chief of Staff to the BEF from the end of 1915 to the start of 1918. For much of 1918 he commanded III Corps in the front line.

Early life and career
Butler was the son of a colonel. He was educated at Harrow and the Royal Military College, Sandhurst,

Butler was commissioned into the Dorset Regiment on 29 October 1890. He was promoted to Lieutenant on 29 October 1892. In March 1896 he was appointed adjutant of the 2nd Dorsets. He was promoted to Captain on 6 April 1897.

He served in the Second Boer War in South Africa, including the Battles of Spion Kop (January 1900), Vaal Krantz and Tugela Heights (February 1900); he rescued a wounded man from the River Tugela during the retreat from Spion Kop. He took part in the Relief of Ladysmith in March 1900. He then served in the Transvaal (June 1900), and in Orange River Colony (June 1900), distinguishing himself in the storming of Alleman's Nek in June 1900. For his war services he was mentioned in despatches, received the Queen's South Africa Medal, and was appointed Brevet Major on 29 November 1900. By now in the Mounted Infantry, he was severely wounded at Fort Itala in September 1901. He was again seconded for service in South Africa in April 1902, when he was appointed in command of the 10th Regiment Mounted Infantry.

Following his return from South Africa, he graduated from Staff College, Camberley in 1906. He was brigade major at Aldershot from April 1906 to April 1910. He became a substantive major in his own regiment in February 1910. In November 1911 he became a GSO2 at Aldershot. He was promoted brevet lieutenant-colonel in May 1913.

First World War
He was selected to command the 2nd Lancashire Fusiliers on 28 June 1914, but on the outbreak of war was instead retained at Aldershot until the end of the training season. He was sent to the front in September 1914. He distinguished himself at the First Battle of Ypres. On 3 November 1914 he was appointed to command 3rd Brigade (part of 1st Division) as a temporary brigadier-general.

He was promoted in substantive rank to brevet colonel on 18 February 1915. On 21 February he was appointed Brigadier-General, General Staff (BGGS) to succeed the fatally wounded John Gough as Chief of Staff to Haig's First Army. He was promoted temporary major-general on 23 June 1915.

On 22 December 1915, following Haig's promotion to be Commander-in-Chief of the BEF, he was appointed Deputy Chief of Staff at GHQ; Haig had wanted him as Chief of Staff, but he was too junior. He was promoted to substantive major-general on 3 June 1916. He was unsympathetic to and impatient with subordinates and in Beckett's view was too energetic for a staff position, and "was generally considered excessively rude and, as a result, he only added to the general isolation of GHQ from the Army". He had little interest in new technology and was a sceptic about the tank. He wanted to resign but Haig refused to release him. He was awarded the CB in 1917.

On 27 February 1918, he was removed as part of the purge of senior officers (others removed included Launcelot Kiggell and John Charteris) from Haig's headquarters. A number of older corps commanders were also retired at this time, creating a vacancy for Butler to command III Corps as a temporary lieutenant-general, in place of Pulteney. Unlike his fellow corps commander Ivor Maxse, Butler favoured holding the front line in strength rather than defence in depth and III Corps bore the brunt of the German Michael Offensive in March 1918. Butler was still in command in the Amiens sector when the Germans were halted in April 1918.

Butler's Corps was in the Amiens sector when the Battle of Amiens took place on 8 August, but he appears to have had a nervous collapse and was suspended from command at the request of Rawlinson, GOC Fourth Army. In October he returned to command for the attack on the Hindenburg Line. Rawlinson appears not to have held him in favour and redeployed him to the quieter Douai sector later that month.

Later life and career
He was awarded the KCB in 1919. From March 1919 he was General Officer Commanding 2nd Division, first in the Army of Occupation in Germany until October 1919 then from November 1919 to February 1923 at Aldershot. He was promoted to permanent lieutenant-general on 3 January 1923. He was General Officer Commanding-in-Chief for Western Command from June 1924 to June 1928. He retired on 1 January 1929.

He ultimately lived at Roden Lodge, Shawbury, in Shropshire, where he died on 22 April 1935.  He is buried in the Parish Churchyard at Hodnet, Shropshire. His wealth at death was £454 11s 1d (around £28,000 at 2016 prices).

Family
On 5 June 1894 he married Helen Frances Battiscombe, the daughter of a major. They had a son and a daughter.

References

Sources
 , essay on Butler written by Ian Beckett.

|-

|-
 

1870 births
1935 deaths
British Army lieutenant generals
British Army personnel of the Second Boer War
British Army generals of World War I
Dorset Regiment officers
Graduates of the Royal Military College, Sandhurst
Knights Commander of the Order of the Bath
Knights Commander of the Order of St Michael and St George
People educated at Harrow School
Graduates of the Staff College, Camberley